Saint-Jean-d'Avelanne is a commune in the Isère department in southeastern France.

Population

See also 
 Communes of the Isère department

References 

Communes of Isère
Isère communes articles needing translation from French Wikipedia